"The Captain's Car" is the fifth episode of the seventh series of the British comedy series Dad's Army. It was originally transmitted on Friday 13 December 1974.

Synopsis
The platoon inherit a Rolls-Royce car and have to prepare for a visiting French General.

Plot
Lady Maltby arrives to see Captain Mainwaring in his office, as she is unable to acquire any petrol for her Rolls-Royce car, so is keen to see it used for the war effort. She is carefully maintaining her class distinction, being very superior to Mainwaring, then catches sight of Sergeant Wilson, and greets him warmly as "Dear Arthur". They talk for a few minutes, obviously well acquainted, leaving Mainwaring fuming.

Mainwaring is very keen to use the vehicle as a staff car, so Private Frazer offers to respray it in camouflage cheaply. Unfortunately, there is a misunderstanding when Frazer collects the car, and he takes the Mayor's Rolls-Royce instead. A great flap ensues, which is calmed down by the accusation that the Mayor's chauffeur obviously had not disabled the car when he left it, which takes the wind out of the angry Mayor's sails. Of course the Mayor's car is now not black but camouflaged, so Frazer has to spray it again.

In the background the town is preparing for the visit of a Free French general. Mainwaring is not impressed, and tells Wilson that "the French don't make very good soldiers, you know, especially after lunch". There is a lot of argument between the Wardens and the Home Guard about who should have the most important spot in the Guard of Honour. Frazer just manages to deliver the Mayor's (now black) car in time, but the paint is still wet.

At the Guard of Honour, the vicar's choir sings half the French National Anthem ("they didn't have time to learn it all"), Wilson gives a welcoming speech in French, and the French General is so overcome he kisses Wilson, then Mainwaring, on both cheeks. Then the flash of Private Cheeseman's camera startles him, and he steadies himself with his hands against the Rolls-Royce, so that when he kisses the outraged Warden Hodges he ends up with black paint all over his face.

Notes 
The main car used in the episode was a 1934 Rolls-Royce 20/25, that belonged to a television and film prop company. Upon arrival for filming the director David Croft noticed that the Spirit of Ecstasy, usually on the bonnet, was missing, and so the car had to be driven back to London immediately for the missing emblem to be retrieved. The same car was used by the character Audrey fforbes-Hamilton in the BBC's To The Manor Born, and in other British and Hollywood films.

Cast

Arthur Lowe as Captain Mainwaring
John Le Mesurier as Sergeant Wilson
Clive Dunn as Lance Corporal Jones
John Laurie as Private Frazer
Arnold Ridley as Private Godfrey
Ian Lavender as Private Pike
Bill Pertwee as ARP Warden Hodges
Talfryn Thomas as Private Cheeseman
Frank Williams as The Vicar
Edward Sinclair as The Verger
Colin Bean as Private Sponge
John Hart Dyke as The French General
Eric Longworth as Town Clerk
Fred McNaughton as The Mayor
Mavis Pugh as Lady Maltby
Robert Raglan as Colonel
Donald Morley as Glossip

References

Dad's Army (series 7) episodes
1974 British television episodes